This is a list of culinary herbs and spices. Specifically these are food or drink additives of mostly botanical origin used in nutritionally insignificant quantities for flavoring or coloring.

This list does not contain fictional plants such as aglaophotis, or recreational drugs such as tobacco.

This list is not for plants used primarily for herbal teas, nor for purely medicinal plant products, such as valerian.

A

 Ajwain, carom seeds (Trachyspermum ammi) (Pakistan, South Asia, India, Afghanistan, Iran, Egypt, Eritrea & Ethiopia)
 Alexanders (Smyrnium olusatrum)
 Alkanet (Alkanna tinctoria), for red color
 Alligator pepper, mbongo spice (mbongochobi), hepper pepper (Aframomum danielli, A. citratum, A. exscapum) (West Africa)
 Allspice (Pimenta dioica)
 Angelica (Angelica archangelica)
 Anise (Pimpinella anisum)
 Aniseed myrtle (Syzygium anisatum) (Australia)
 Annatto (Bixa orellana)
 Artemisia (Artemisia spp.)
 Asafoetida (Ferula assafoetida)
 Avens (Geum urbanum)
 Avocado leaf (Persea americana)

B

 Barberry (Berberis vulgaris and other Berberis spp.)
 Basil, sweet (Ocimum basilicum)
 Basil, Holy (Ocimum tenuiflorum)
 Basil, lemon (Ocimum × citriodorum)
 Basil, Thai (O. basilicum var. thyrsiflora)
 Bay leaf (Laurus nobilis)
 Bay leaf, Indian; tejpat, malabathrum (Cinnamomum tamala)
 Bay leaf, Indonesian; Indonesian laurel, Salam leaf, daun salam (Syzygium polyanthum)
 Bay leaf, Mexican; laurél (Litsea glaucescens)
 Bay leaf, West Indian (Pimenta racemosa)
 Blue fenugreek, blue melilot (Trigonella caerulea)
 Boldo (Peumus boldus)
 Borage (Borago officinalis)

C

 California bay laurel (Umbellularia californica)
 Cao guo, Chinese black cardamom (Lanxangia tsaoko) (China)
 Caper (Capparis spinosa)
 Caraway (Carum carvi)
 Cardamom (Elettaria cardamomum)
 Cardamom, black; badi ilaichi (Amomum subulatum, Amomum costatum) (India, Pakistan)
 Cassia (Cinnamomum aromaticum)
 Cayenne pepper (Capsicum annuum)
 Celery leaf (Apium graveolens)
 Celery seed (Apium graveolens)
 Chervil (Anthriscus cerefolium)
 Chicory (Cichorium intybus)
 Chili pepper (Capsicum spp.)
 Chironji, charoli (Buchanania lanzan)
 Chives (Allium schoenoprasum)
 Cicely, sweet cicely (Myrrhis odorata)
 Cilantro, coriander greens, coriander herb, Chinese parsley (Coriandrum sativum)
 Cinnamon, Indonesian (Cinnamomum burmannii, Cassia vera)
 Cinnamon, Saigon or Vietnamese (Cinnamomum loureiroi)
 Cinnamon, true or Ceylon (Cinnamomum verum, C. zeylanicum)
 Cinnamon, white (Canella winterana)
 Cinnamon myrtle (Backhousia myrtifolia) (Australia)
 Clary, Clary sage (Salvia sclarea)
 Clove (Syzygium aromaticum)
 Coriander seed (Coriandrum sativum)
 Coriander, Vietnamese (Persicaria odorata)
 Costmary (Tanacetum balsamita)
 Cubeb pepper (Piper cubeba)
 Culantro, culangot, long coriander, recao (Eryngium foetidum)
 Cumin (Cuminum cyminum)
 Curry leaf (Murraya koenigii)
 Curry plant (Helichrysum italicum)
 Cyperus articulatus

D
 Dill herb or weed (Anethum graveolens)
 Dill seed (Anethum graveolens)
 Dootsi (Agasyllis latifolia)

E
 Elderflower (Sambucus spp.)
 Epazote (Dysphania ambrosioides)

F

 Fennel (Foeniculum vulgare)
 Fenugreek (Trigonella foenum-graecum)
 Filé powder, gumbo filé (Sassafras albidum)
 Fingerroot, temu kuntji, krachai, k'cheay (Boesenbergia rotunda) (Java, Thailand, Cambodia)
 Fish mint, leaf; giấp cá (Houttuynia cordata) (Vietnam)
 Fish mint, rhizome; zhé ěrgēn (Houttuynia cordata) (Guizhou, Sichuan, Yunnan, and Guangxi provinces of China)

G

 Galangal, greater (Alpinia galanga)
 Galangal, lesser (Alpinia officinarum)
 Garlic (Allium sativum)
 Garlic chives (Allium tuberosum)
 Ginger (Zingiber officinale)
 Ginger, torch; bunga siantan (Etlingera elatior) (Indonesia)
 Golpar, Persian hogweed (Heracleum persicum) (Iran)
 Grains of paradise (Aframomum melegueta)
 Grains of Selim, Kani pepper (Xylopia aethiopica)

H

 Hoja santa, hierba santa, acuyo (Piper auritum) (Mexico)
 Horseradish (Armoracia rusticana)
 Huacatay, Mexican marigold, mint marigold (Tagetes minuta)
 Hyssop (Hyssopus officinalis)

J

 Jasmine flowers (Jasminum spp.)
 Jakhya (Cleome viscosa)
 Jalapeño (Capsicum annuum cultivar)
 Jimbu (Allium hypsistum) (Nepal)
 Juniper berry (Juniperus communis)

K

 Kaffir lime leaves, Makrud lime leaves (Citrus hystrix) (Southeast Asia)
 Kala zeera (or kala jira), black cumin (Bunium persicum) (South Asia)
 Keluak, kluwak, kepayang (Pangium edule)
 Kencur, galangal, kentjur (Kaempferia galanga) (Java, Bali)
 Kinh gioi, Vietnamese balm (Elsholtzia ciliata)
 Kokam seed (Garcinia indica) (Indian confectionery)
 Korarima, Ethiopian cardamom, false cardamom (Aframomum corrorima) (Eritrea)
 Koseret leaves (Lippia abyssinica) (Ethiopia)
Kudum Puli (Garcinia gummi-gutta)

L

 Lavender (Lavandula spp.)
 Lemon balm (Melissa officinalis)
 Lemon ironbark (Eucalyptus staigeriana) (Australia)
 Lemon myrtle (Backhousia citriodora) (Australia)
 Lemon verbena (Lippia citriodora)
 Lemongrass (Cymbopogon citratus, C. flexuosus, and other Cymbopogon spp.)
 Leptotes bicolor (Paraguay and southern Brazil)
 Lesser calamint (Calamintha nepeta), nipitella, nepitella (Italy)
 Licorice, liquorice (Glycyrrhiza glabra)
 Lime flower, linden flower (Tilia spp.)
 Lovage (Levisticum officinale)
Locust beans (Ceratonia siliqua)

M

 Mace (Myristica fragrans)
 Mahleb, mahalepi, St. Lucie cherry (Prunus mahaleb)
 Marjoram (Origanum majorana)
 Mastic (Pistacia lentiscus)
 Mint (Mentha spp.), 25 species, hundreds of varieties
 Mountain horopito (Pseudowintera colorata),  'pepper-plant' (New Zealand)
 Musk mallow, abelmosk (Abelmoschus moschatus)
 Mustard, black, mustard plant, mustard seed (Brassica nigra)
 Mustard, brown, mustard plant, mustard seed (Brassica juncea)
 Mustard, white, mustard plant, mustard seed (Sinapis alba)
 Mustard, yellow (Brassica hirta = Sinapis alba)

N

 New Mexico chile (Capsicum annuum 'New Mexico Group''', also known as Hatch or Anaheim) which includes Big Jim, Chimayó, and Sandia, and other pepper cultivars.
 Nigella, black caraway, black cumin, black onion seed, kalonji (Nigella sativa)
 Njangsa, djansang (Ricinodendron heudelotii) (West Africa)
 Nutmeg (Myristica fragrans)

O

 Olida (Eucalyptus olida) (Australia)
 Oregano (Origanum vulgare, O. heracleoticum, and other species)
 Oregano, Cuban (Coleus amboinicus)
 Oregano, Mexican (Lippia graveolens)
 Orris root (Iris germanica, I. florentina, I. pallida)

P

 Pandan flower, kewra (Pandanus odoratissimus)
 Pandan leaf, screwpine (Pandanus amaryllifolius)
 Pápalo (Porophyllum ruderale) (Mexico and South America) 
 Paprika (Capsicum annuum)
 Paracress (Acmella oleracea) (Brazil)
 Parsley (Petroselinum crispum)
 Pennyroyal (Mentha pulegium)
 Pepper, black, white, and green (Piper nigrum)
 Pepper, Brazilian, or pink pepper (Schinus terebinthifolius)
 Pepper, Dorrigo (Tasmannia stipitata) (Australia)
 Pepper, long (Piper longum)
 Pepper, mountain, Cornish pepper leaf (Tasmannia lanceolata)
 Peppermint (Mentha piperata)
 Peppermint gum leaf (Eucalyptus dives)
 Perilla (Mentha pulegium)
 Deulkkae (Perilla frutescens seeds)
 Kkaennip (Perilla frutescens leaves)
 Shiso (Perilla frutescens var. crispa leaves)
 Peruvian pepper (Schinus molle)
 Pipicha, straight-leaf pápalo (Porophyllum linaria) (Mexico)
 Poppy seed (Papaver somniferum) 
 Purslane

Q
 Quassia (Quassia amara), bitter spice in aperitifs and some beers and fortified wines

R

 Red rice powder (Monascus purpureus) (China)
 Rice paddy herb (Limnophila aromatica) (Vietnam)
 Rosemary (Rosmarinus officinalis)
 Rue (Ruta graveolens)

S

 Safflower (Carthamus tinctorius), only for yellow color 
 Saffron (Crocus sativus) 
 use of saffron
 Sage (Salvia officinalis)
 Salad burnet (Sanguisorba minor)
 Salep (Orchis mascula)
 Sassafras (Sassafras albidum)
Sesame Seed, Black Sesame Seed
 Savory, summer (Satureja hortensis)
 Savory, winter (Satureja montana)
 Shiso (Perilla frutescens)
 Sichuan pepper (Zanthoxylum piperitum)
 Silphium, silphion, laser, laserpicium, sorado (Ancient Roman cuisine, Ancient Greek cuisine)
 Sorrel (Rumex acetosa)
 Sorrel, sheep (Rumex acetosella)
 Spearmint (Mentha spicata)
 Spikenard (Nardostachys grandiflora or N. jatamansi)
 Star anise (Illicium verum)
 Stone parsley (Sison amomum)
 Sumac (Rhus coriaria)
 Sweet woodruff (Galium odoratum)

T

 Tarragon (Artemisia dracunculus)
 Tasmanian pepper (Tasmannia lanceolata))
 Thyme (Thymus vulgaris)
 Thyme, lemon (Thymus citriodorus)
 Tonka beans (Dipteryx odorata)
 Turmeric (Curcuma longa)

V

 Vanilla (Vanilla planifolia)
 Voatsiperifery (Piper borbonense) [Madagascar]

W

 Wasabi (Wasabia japonica)
 Water-pepper, smartweed (Polygonum hydropiper)
 Wattleseed (from about 120 spp. of Australian Acacia)
 Wild thyme (Thymus serpyllum)
 Wintergreen (Gaultheria procumbens)
 Wood avens, herb bennet (Geum urbanum)
 Woodruff (Galium odoratum)
 Wormwood, absinthe (Artemisia absinthium)

Y
 Yerba buena, any of four different species, many unrelated
 Yarrow (Achillea millefolium)

Z
 Za'atar (herbs from the genera Origanum, Calamintha, Thymus, and Satureja)
 Zedoary (Curcuma zedoaria'')

See also

 Bushfood spices
 Food grading of spices
 Herb
 List of basil cultivars
 List of Capsicum cultivars
 List of dried foods
 List of food origins
 List of smoked spices
 List of spice mixes
 List of spices used in root beer
 List of foods
 Seasoning
 Spice Bazaar, Istanbul
 Spice mix
 Spice use in Antiquity

Culinary herbs and spices by country, region and culture

 List of Afghani spices and herbs
 Assamese spices
 Aztec spices
 Bulgarian spices
 Chilean herbs and spices
 Hungarian spices
 Indonesian spices
 List of Armenian spices and herbs
 List of Australian herbs and spices
 List of Bangladeshi spices
 List of Gujarati spices
 List of Indian spices
 List of Indonesian spices (bumbu)
 List of Indonesian spices
 List of Italian herbs and spices
 List of Pakistani spices
 List of Puerto Rican spices and seasonings
 List of Thai herbs and spices
 List of Vietnamese spices and herbs (Vietnamese ingredients)
 Lithuanian spices
 Manado spices
 Medieval spices
 Moroccan spices
 Nigerien spices
 Sri Lankan spices
 South Asian spices
 Thai herbs and spices
 Vietnamese herbs and spices

References

Lists of plants
Lists of foods
Gardening lists
+